Joseph Elliott Belmont (July 12, 1934 – January 6, 2019) was an American basketball player and coach.  He played college basketball at Duke University, and was selected in the 1956 NBA Draft by the Philadelphia Warriors.  He never played in the NBA, however.  He had a long playing career with the Denver-Chicago Truckers of the National Industrial Basketball League.

In 1970, he was hired as the head coach of the American Basketball Association's Denver Rockets, a position he held for as season and a half.  He shared ABA Coach of the Year honors in 1970 with Bill Sharman of the Utah Stars.

In 2005 Belmont was inducted into the Colorado Sports Hall of Fame.

Personal life
In 1959 Belmont married Helen Sanquist and then had 2 kids. He died on January 6, 2019.

Coaching career

ABA

|-
| align="left" |DEN
| align="left" | 1969–70
|56||42||14||.750|| align="center" |1st in Western||12||5||7||.000
| align="center" |Lost in Division Finals
|-
| align="left" |DEN
| align="left" | 1970–71
|13||3||10||.231|| align="center" |(fired)||-||-||-||-
| align="center" |(fired)
|-class="sortbottom"
| align="left" |Career
| ||69||45||24||.652|| ||12||5||7||.417

References

External links
 BasketballReference.com: Joe Belmont

1934 births
2019 deaths
Amateur Athletic Union men's basketball players
Basketball coaches from Pennsylvania
Basketball players from Philadelphia
Denver Rockets head coaches
Duke Blue Devils men's basketball players
Philadelphia Warriors draft picks
American men's basketball players